Piotrowice  is a village in the administrative district of Gmina Przeciszów, within Oświęcim County, Lesser Poland Voivodeship, in southern Poland.

The village has an approximate population of 2,000.

References

Villages in Oświęcim County